Łukasz Tymiński (born 8 November 1990) is a Polish footballer.

Honours

Club
 Śląsk Wrocław:
Ekstraklasa Cup
Winner (1): 2009

Career

Club
In March 2010, he was loaned to Polonia Bytom on a one-year deal from Śląsk Wrocław. In January 2011, he was sold to Polonia.

In July 2011, he joined Jagiellonia Białystok on a four-year contract.

References

External links
 

1990 births
Living people
People from Żywiec
Sportspeople from Silesian Voivodeship
Polish footballers
Association football midfielders
Śląsk Wrocław players
Polonia Bytom players
Jagiellonia Białystok players
Ruch Chorzów players
Okocimski KS Brzesko players
Ekstraklasa players
Górnik Łęczna players